The 2016–17 Egyptian Premier League (also known as the Obour Land Premier League for sponsorship reasons) was the 58th season of the Egyptian Premier League, the top Egyptian professional league for association football clubs, since its establishment in 1948. The season began on 15 September 2016 and concluded on 17 July 2017. Fixtures for the 2016–17 season were announced on 22 August 2016.

On 29 May 2017, Al Ahly won a record thirty-ninth title and successfully defended their title with four games in hand following their 2–2 draw with Misr Lel Makkasa.

Al Nasr Lel Taa'den, El Sharkia and Tanta have entered as the three promoted teams from the 2015–16 Egyptian Second Division.

Teams

A total of eighteen teams will compete in the league – the top fifteen teams from the previous season, as well as three teams promoted from the Second Division.

Stadia and locations
''Note: Table lists in alphabetical order.

Personnel and kits

Managerial changes

Results

League table

Positions by round
The table lists the positions of teams after each week of matches. In order to preserve chronological evolvements, any postponed matches are not included in the round at which they were originally scheduled, but added to the full round they were played immediately afterwards. For example, if a match is scheduled for matchday 13, but then postponed and played between days 16 and 17, it will be added to the standings for day 16.
 

Source: Soccerway

Results table

Season statistics

Top goalscorers

†Nana Poku moved to UAE Arabian Gulf League side Al Shabab during the January transfer window.

Top assists

Hat-tricks

References

1
2016–17 in Egyptian football
Egypt